The Sports Car Challenge at Mid-Ohio is a sports car race held annually at the Mid-Ohio Sports Car Course.  The race began in 1963 as a part of the United States Road Racing Championship.  It was part of the IMSA GT Championship from 1972 until 1993, and the American Le Mans Series from 2001 to 2002 and again from 2004 to 2012.  From 2007 until 2012 the race took place on the same weekend as the IndyCar Series' Honda 200 and the event was sponsored by Acura from 2007 until 2009 and again in 2018. It was announced in July 2017 that the race would return on May 4-6 2018 as part of the IMSA WeatherTech SportsCar Championship.

Results

References

External links
United SportsCar Championship official site
Ultimate Racing History: Mid-Ohio archive
Racing Sports Cars: Mid-Ohio archive
World Sports Racing Prototypes: IMSA archive

 
Recurring sporting events established in 1963